Danny Pope (born February 11, 1960, of English and Italian heritage) is a bespoke photographic printer and restorer.  Pope has printed works  for photographers such as Andrew Catlin, David Hiscock, Linda McCartney, Gian Paolo Barbieri, Calum Colvin, Tim Page, Corinne Day, Ian McKell, Brian Aris, Eve Arnold, The Douglas Brothers, Terry O’Neil, David Bailey, Barry Lategan and Terence Donovan.

Panorama Magazine called Pope the "Master of Polopan Printing". Pope was the first color printer to win the Ilford Printer of the Year Award in 1993.

Early life and career
Pope completed Foundation Studies in Fine Art at Falmouth School of Art in 1980, where he practiced painting in a photo realist style. Following that, Pope worked on a Manpower Services  Project, painting murals on canvas for a hospice in the East End. Working from transparencies taken locally in the East End, It was here that Pope taught himself how to make Cibrachrome prints from the slides as reference material to paint from.

In 1983, Pope launched Matchless Prints Ltd in Clerkenwell Road, London, following the support of Terry Donovan, who encouraged him to go into business, despite his lack of formal training, and disregarding the fact he was only 23. Early on he worked for clients such as Roger Charity, Mark LeBon and Eamon McCabe, producing creative prints that utilized different filtrations to the norm.

Pope is credited with being the first printer to use the technique of “painting with light” on black and white Polapan transparencies to produce complex color prints. Matchless Prints moved to Bloomsbury in 1990 and in 2001 Pope opened another Matchless Prints studio in Milan. In 2006 Pope opened Steidlville London, the first showcase bookstore for publisher, Steidl.

With the advent of digital technology, now Pope translates the skills of traditional wet printing within the digital domain.

Articles 
 Seeing in the Dark  The British Journal of Photography, 13 March 1987
 Dark Secrets Creative Review April 1989 
 Prints Charming, Panorama, September 1991
 Printz of Darkness Practical Photography October 1992
 Swimming against the Tide Professional Photographer, December 1995
 Darkroom  Confidential The British Journal of Photography February 2006

Exhibitions and Book Launches (Printing Credits)

Awards and honours

llford Photographic Awards 
 Award  Ilfochrome Printer of the Year, 1992
 Highly Commended  Advertising and Fashion Colour, 1992
 Highly Commended     Advertising and fashion colour, 1992
 Award   Advertising and Fashion Colour. 1993
 Award   Industrial and Commercial, 1993
 Highly Commended   Electronic Imaging, 1993
 Title and Trophy Ilfochrome Printer of the Year, 1993

The British Picture Editors Awards 
 Colour print award 1993
 Colour print award 1994

References

External links 
 Official Website

1960 births
Living people